Ganta Black Stars is a club based in Ganta Liberia. 
The team plays in Liberian Premier League the top league of Liberian Football.

Stadium
Their home stadium is the Ganta Sports Stadium in Ganta.

League participations
 Liberian Premier League: 2013– (As Ganta)
 Liberian Second Division League: ????–2013

References

External links
Soccerway
Rssf

Football clubs in Liberia